Pak Phli is a district (amphoe) in the eastern part of Nakhon Nayok province, central Thailand.

History
Pak Phli district was established in 1893, then named Bung Rai (บุ่งไร่). In 1905 the district was renamed to Nong Pho (หนองโพธิ์). In the same year, the district office was moved to Ban Tha Daeng, Tambon Pak Phli, and the government renamed the district to Khao Yai, but in 1909 the district's name reverted to the current name, Pak Phli.

Around 1922 some people from Ban Tha Dan and Ban Tha Chai villages in Nakhon Nayok province built a settlement within the forest in the mountains of the Sankamphaeng Range. Up to 30 households cultivated the land. The area was formally recognized by the government and classified as Tambon Khao Yai within Pak Phli District. However, due to its location and distance from the authorities it became a refuge for criminals and fugitives. After an attempt to capture the fugitives in the area, in 1932 the villagers were relocated into the plains some 30 km away and the tambon status was cancelled. In 1959 the then-Prime Minister of Thailand, Marshall Sarit Thanarat, ordered the Ministry of Agriculture and the Ministry of the Interior to create a process whereby national parks could be established and Khao Yai National Park, established in 1962 in this area, would adopt the name of the former tambon.

Pak Phli, the name of the district, originated in the times when the locals still traveled by water. In the rainy season the water at the mouth of Khlong Yang was flowing fast, which caused many accidents. Thus the people built a shrine to commemorate the dead people and salute Deva, what in Thai is called Phli or Phli Kam (พลี or พลีกรรม). After that they called the canal Khlong Pak Phli. The name Pak Phli was then also used for the village and tambon.

Geography
Neighboring districts are (from the west clockwise) Mueang Nakhon Nayok of Nakhon Nayok Province, Pak Chong of Nakhon Ratchasima province, Prachantakham, Mueang Prachin Buri and Ban Sang of Prachinburi province.

The Sankamphaeng Range mountainous area is in the northern section of this district.

Administration
The district is divided into seven sub-districts (tambons), which are further subdivided into 51 villages (mubans). Ko Wai is a township (thesaban tambon), which covers parts of tambon Ko Wai. There are a further seven tambon administrative organizations (TAO).

External links
 Pak Phli district history (Thai)

Pak Phli